Drágszél is a small village in Bács-Kiskun county, in the Southern Great Plain region of Hungary.

Geography

Populated places in Bács-Kiskun County